Paganamaa is a settlement in Rõuge Parish, Võru County in southeastern Estonia.

References

Villages in Võru County
Estonia–Latvia border crossings